Niranrit Jarernsuk (born June 9, 1990) is a Thai retired professional footballer.

External links
Niranrit Jarernsuk at soccerway.com

1990 births
Living people
Niranrit Jarernsuk
Niranrit Jarernsuk
Association football midfielders
Niranrit Jarernsuk
Niranrit Jarernsuk
Niranrit Jarernsuk
Niranrit Jarernsuk
Niranrit Jarernsuk
Niranrit Jarernsuk
Niranrit Jarernsuk
Niranrit Jarernsuk
Niranrit Jarernsuk